Nauru was represented at the 2002 Commonwealth Games in Manchester by a team consisting solely of weight-lifters. Marcus Stephen, who would become President of Nauru five years later, competed for the fourth and last time. The 2002 Games were the first edition of the Commonwealth Games in which he failed to win a gold medal; Nauru's two golds were won by Reanna Solomon.

The 2002 Games marked Nauru's fourth participation in the Commonwealth Games, and the small country achieved by far its best result to date, with fifteen medals. It was also the first time that women had represented Nauru at the Games. Female athletes won ten of Nauru's fifteen medals, including its two gold.

Medals

Medalists

Gold
 Reanna Solomon, Weightlifting, Women's 75 kg+ Clean and Jerk
 Reanna Solomon, Weightlifting, Women's 75 kg+ Combined

Silver
 Marcus Stephen, Weightlifting, Men's 62 kg Clean and Jerk
 Marcus Stephen, Weightlifting, Men's 62 kg Combined
 Marcus Stephen, Weightlifting, Men's 62 kg Snatch
 Jalon Renos Doweiya, Weightlifting, Men's 77 kg Clean and Jerk
 Jalon Renos Doweiya, Weightlifting, Men's 77 kg Combined

Bronze
 Ebonette Deigaeruk, Weightlifting, Women's 48 kg Clean and Jerk
 Ebonette Deigaeruk, Weightlifting, Women's 48 kg Combined
 Ebonette Deigaeruk, Weightlifting, Women's 48 kg Snatch
 Sheba Deireragea, Weightlifting, Women's 69 kg Clean and Jerk
 Sheba Deireragea, Weightlifting, Women's 69 kg Combined
 Sheba Deireragea, Weightlifting, Women's 69 kg Snatch
 Mary Diranga, Weightlifting, Women's 75 kg Clean and Jerk
 Reanna Solomon, Weightlifting, Women's 75 kg+ Snatch

Sources
 Official results

Sport in Nauru
Nauru at the Commonwealth Games
Nations at the 2002 Commonwealth Games
2002 in Nauruan sport